Robert Graydon (1744 – 1800) was an Irish politician.

Graydon sat as a Member of Parliament for Harristown in the Irish House of Commons from 1768 to 1776, before representing Kildare Borough between 1790 and 1797.

References

1744 births
1800 deaths
Irish MPs 1769–1776
Irish MPs 1790–1797
Members of the Parliament of Ireland (pre-1801) for County Kildare constituencies